Morocco Bound is a farcical English Edwardian musical comedy in two acts by Arthur Branscombe, with music by F. Osmond Carr and lyrics by Adrian Ross.  It opened at the Shaftesbury Theatre in London, on 13 April 1893, under the management of Fred J. Harris, and transferred to the Trafalgar Square Theatre on 8 January 1894, running for a total of 295 performances.  A young George Grossmith, Jr. was in the cast (where he made the most of the small role of Sir Percy Pimpleton by adding ad-libs), as was Letty Lind.  Harry Grattan and Richard Temple later joined the cast.

This musical opened in the same year as Gilbert and Sullivan's Utopia, Limited and shared a number of features with that opera, including a distant, exotic locale, and both presented British archetypes as exemplars.  Morocco Bound crystallized the music-hall influenced "variety musical" form and was more representative than Utopia of the prevailing taste of London theatre audiences, which was turning away from comic opera.

Roles

Spoofah Bey (An Irish Con-Man) - Mr. John L. Shine  
Squire Higgins (One Of The Nouveau-Riche) - Charles Danby  
Vivian Higgins (The Squire's Eldest Son) - Sydney Barraclough  
Dolly Higgins (Another Of The Squire's Sons) - Alfred C. Seymour 
Josiah Higgins (The Squire's Brother) - Herbert Sparling 
Lord Percy Pimpleton - George Grossmith Jr. 
Sid Fakah (Moroccan Grand Vizier) - Colin Coop
Musket (A Servant) - Douglas Munro  
Maude Sportington (Dolly's Girl-Friend) - Letty Lind
Ethel Sportington (Vivian's Girl-Friend) - Violet Cameron
Comtesse De La Blague (Spoofah's Sister, A Phoney "Countess") - Jennie McNulty  
Lady Walkover (Maude's Friend) - Agnes Hewitt 
Rhea Porter (A Lady Journalist) - Marie Studholme
Eva Sketchley - Eva Westlake  
Hilda Adlette - Ruby Temple

Synopsis
An Irish adventurer enlists the help of a retired costermonger and an assortment of British characters to travel to Morocco, where the Irishman had hopes of winning the right to sell theatre concessions. Once there, he fools the local Vizier into believing that his companions are representatives of "the flower of the British music hall" and eventually secures his business venture.

Musical numbers

Act I -   Mokeleigh Hall, an English stately home
No. 1 - Opening Chorus - "England is diversified by eligible mansions..." 
No. 2 - Song - Musket - "I've serv'd the boards of 'aughty lords..." (three verses) 
No. 3 - Duet - Maude & Lady Walkover - "The latest social appetite, of course, you know..." 
No. 4 - Song - Ethel - "When maidens fair in days of old..." 
No. 5 - Song - Spoofah - "If I had cash to cut a dash, I'd run as straight as any..." 
No. 6 - Duet - Comtesse & Spoofah - "In pastoral seclusion how happily we'll fare..." 
No. 7 - Chorus - "Hurrah, hurrah, hurrah, hurrah for the Squire..." 
No. 8 - Song - Squire ("Honesty Jim") - "I never 'ad friends for to foster, or give me a show at a stall..." 
No. 9 - Chorus and Solos - Vivian & Squire - "Gladly greet our future master, welcome home our coming lord..." 
No. 10 - Song - Ethel - "If I were a royal lady, and he were of low degree..." 
No. 11 - Trio and Dance - Spoofah, Squire & Josiah - "The thought of ev'ry Englishman, who's not a Laboucherian..." 
No. 12 - Song - Vivian - "Stars come out in the skies that darken, silent above..." 
No. 13 - Pas Seul 
No. 14 - Duet - Ethel & Vivian - "There's a word, or possibly two..." 
No. 15 - Song - Spoofah & Chorus - "I have stay'd for a time at each palace sublime..." 
No. 16 - Finale Act I - "I'll tell you what I'll do..." 

Act II -   The Palace of Spoofah Beh in Old Tangier, Morocco
No. 1 - Opening Chorus Act II - "Fareshah! Fareshah! Fareshah! Mareshah! Chareshah oum!..." 
No. 2 - Song - Vizier, with Chorus - "I am the very Grand Vizier, to all the land extremely dear..." 
No. 2a - "Morocco Boot" - Grotesque Exit 
No. 3 - Scene and Song - Squire, with Chorus - "My lord, it comes..." 
No. 4 - Song - Vivian - "Light of love that only made my life so bright..." 
No. 5 - Chorus - "Once more we have the leave to enter in procession..." 
No. 6 - Song - Maude and Chorus - "I'm the queen of merry Monaco, known to all the visitors who go..." 
No. 7 - Drinking Song (singer unspecified) - "Oh, morning bids the hunter wake and blow the merry horn..." 
No. 8 - Song - Spoofah and Chorus - "I will tell you all that happen'd to the  plan..." 
No. 9 - Cymbal Dance - Pas Seul 
No. 10 - Duet - Squire and Spoofah - "If you go to a swell Music Hall..." 
No. 11 - Concerted Piece - Finale - The Red Morocco Boot - "If you should ask for our advice..."

References

External links
Midi files, lyrics and opening cast list
Brief profile of Morocco Bound
Discusses the musical as compared with The Nautch Girl and Utopia, Limited
Information about London productions that opened in 1893

1893 musicals
West End musicals
British musicals